Jach'a Waylla Punta (Aymara jach'a big, waylla Stipa obtusa, a kind of feather grass, Spanish punta point, also spelled Jacha Huaylla Punta or Jacha Huayna Punta) is a  mountain in the Andes of Bolivia. It is located in the La Paz Department, Larecaja Province, Sorata Municipality. Jach'a Waylla Punta lies in the northern extensions of the Cordillera Real southeast of the mountain Wila Wilani and south of Wankar Quta Qullu. It is situated at the rivers Q'asiri Jawira and Ch'uch'u Jawira.

References 

Mountains of La Paz Department (Bolivia)